Jengish Chokusu (Pik Pobedy) is the highest mountain in the Tian Shan mountain system at . It lies on the Kyrgyzstan–China border between the Ak-Suu District, in the Issyk-Kul Region of far Eastern Kyrgyzstan and Wensu County, Xinjiang, China. It is part of the Kakshaal Too, the highest part of the Tian Shan and located southeast of lake Issyk Kul.

Names 
The mountain's official name in Kyrgyz is Jengish Chokusu, which means "Victory Peak"; its Russian name is Pik Pobedy (or Pobeda Peak) meaning the same. In Uyghur, it is called Tömür, meaning 'iron,' which is also the official name of the mountain in China. The Chinese name Tuōmù'ěr Fēng is a phoneticization of the Uighur tomur and the Chinese feng meaning 'peak'.

Description 
Jengish Chokusu is a massif, with several summits along its lengthy ridge. Only its main summit breaks .

The massif runs at right angles to the glaciers which flow from it into three alpine valleys in Kyrgyzstan on the north, all eventually running to the Engilchek Glacier, the largest in the Tian Shan. Its main summit is usually approached from the Zvozdochka (Russian for "little star") glacier, which is coloured red with rocks from Jengish Chokusu.

Administratively, the Kyrgyzstan side of the mountain is in the Ak-Suu District of Issyk-Kul Region and the Chinese side, in Wensu County of the Aksu Prefecture of Xinjiang Uyghur Autonomous Region.

Records

Jengish Chokusu is the highest mountain in Kyrgyzstan. Jengish Chokusu is considered the most northerly 7,000-metre mountain in the world by geologists; the actual rock summit of Khan Tengri, the Tian Shan's third highest peak, is 6,995m above sea level, though a thick layer of ice adds another 15m to its altitude, such that mountaineers classify it as a 7,000m peak.

The South Engilchek Glacier and its side glaciers occupy the entire north side of Peak Jengish Chokusu.  This glacier, currently at 60.5 km in length, is the sixth longest outside of the world's polar regions.

History

Although Jengish Chokusu is over 400 metres higher, Khan Tengri was believed to be the highest peak in the range until Jengish Chokusu's survey in 1943.[4] 

A Soviet expedition mounted in 1938 to mark the 20th anniversary of the founding of the Communist Youth movement Komsomol claimed to have climbed the highest peak in the area, the summit being reached on 19 September by L. Gutman, E. Ivanov and A. Sidorenko. They measured the altitude as 6,900 metres, and named the peak Pik 20-ti letiya Komsomola (Peak of the 20th Anniversary of Komsomol).

A survey by another team in 1943 found the peak to be 7,439 metres high. The peak was renamed as Pik Pobedy (Victory's Peak) in 1946 to commemorate the Soviet victory in World War II. The significant difference in altitude led to the 1938 ascent being called into question, although the official Soviet stand was to uphold the 1938 ascent.

A large-scale attempt on the peak in 1955 was disastrous, when 11 expedition members were killed in a blizzard. Jengish Chokusu's first indisputably verified ascent was in 1956 by Vitaly Abalakov's party.

A Chinese expedition climbed the peak from the Chinese side in 1977: the expedition book makes no mention of the Russian first ascent and gives the impression that the Chinese ascent was the first climb.

The first winter ascent of Peak Pobeda was made by Valery Khrichtchatyi (team leader), S. Ovcharenko, G. Mikhailov, and brothers G. Bogomolov and S. Bogomolov on February 2, 1990.

References

Further reading

External links
 Route maps
 Virtual Aerial Video of Jengish Chokusu 

Mountains of Xinjiang
Mountains of Kyrgyzstan
China–Kyrgyzstan border
International mountains of Asia
Issyk-Kul Region
Aksu Prefecture
Highest points of countries
Seven-thousanders of the Tian Shan